VDS is a three-letter abbreviation which may mean:

Places
Vadsø Airport (IATA airport code VDS), Norway
Vidyasagar railway station (train station code VDS), Deoghar, Jharkhand, India
Vanderbilt Divinity School, Nashville, Tennessee, US

Computing
Virtual dedicated server, a virtual machine set up as a server
Visual DialogScript, a programming language
Virtual directory server
Virtual DMA Services, an API

Other uses
Variable depth sonar, an array of towed sonars
Vehicle Dependability Study
Village design statement, in English rural planning
Village Drama Society, a theatrical society founded in England in 1919
Vaccino Diffondente Salvioli, a tuberculosis vaccine

See also

 
 VD (disambiguation)